RFA Tidesurge (A98) was a  of the Royal Fleet Auxiliary.

Launched in 1954, the ship was originally named Tiderange but was renamed in 1958 to avoid confusion with other members of the class. She was decommissioned in 1976 and left Portsmouth under tow on 19 April 1977 for Valencia where she was scrapped in June 1977.

References

Tide-class replenishment oilers
1954 ships